Tyler Plante (born April 16, 1987) is an American-born Canadian former professional ice hockey goaltender who last played with the Lørenskog IK of the GET-ligaen. He is currently the goaltending coach for the Brandon Wheat Kings of the WHL

Playing career
Tyler was drafted by the Florida Panthers in the second round, 32nd overall, in the 2005 NHL Entry Draft. Tyler gained NHL attention playing for the Brandon Wheat Kings of the Western Hockey League and earning the Jim Piggott Memorial Trophy as the top rookie of the WHL in the 2004–05 season. After three full seasons with the Wheat Kings Plante was signed by the Panthers to a three-year entry level contract on June 1, 2007. Since then, he has spent most of his playing time with the Florida Panthers AHL affiliates, the Rochester Americans until 2011, then the San Antonio Rampage.

He was recalled up to Florida for a pre-season game at the start of the 2008–09 NHL season, but didn't get any playing time and started the season in Rochester. After a lackluster start with the Americans, he was demoted to the ECHL, and spent time with the Dayton Bombers. After spending over two months with the Bombers, he was called back up to Rochester.

On September 30, 2011, the Florida Panthers assigned Plante to play in the AHL with the San Antonio Rampage. With the Panthers stockpile of goaltending prospects, Plante was demoted to the ECHL with the Cincinnati Cyclones before he opted to pursue a playing career abroad with the ambition to further his career. He signed a contract with Swedish second division club, Mora IK of the HockeyAllsvenskan. Plante played 6 games with Mora before signing with top-tier club Djurgårdens IF. He dressed as backup for 11 games with Djurgårdens IF without seeing any ice time.

In the 2012–13 season, Plante was instrumental in helping HC Asiago win the Serie A Championship.

After retiring from hockey, Plante joined his former WHL team, the Brandon Wheat Kings, as a goaltending coach in 2016.

Personal life
Plante was born in Milwaukee, Wisconsin and raised in Brandon, Manitoba. Plante was born in while his father, Cam, was a member of the Milwaukee Admirals. His brother, Alex, was a first round draft pick of the Edmonton Oilers.

Plante was married in the summer of 2013. Plante and his wife Jordana have two children, a son and a daughter.

He now sells real estate in Brandon, Manitoba with his father, Cam.

Career statistics

References

External links

1987 births
Living people
American men's ice hockey goaltenders
Asiago Hockey 1935 players
Brandon Wheat Kings players
Canadian ice hockey goaltenders
Cincinnati Cyclones (ECHL) players
Colorado Eagles players
Dayton Bombers players
Florida Everblades players
Florida Panthers draft picks
Ice hockey people from Manitoba
Ice hockey coaches from Wisconsin
Lørenskog IK players
Mora IK players
San Antonio Rampage players
Sheffield Steelers players
Sportspeople from Brandon, Manitoba
Rochester Americans players
Sportspeople from Milwaukee
Canadian expatriate ice hockey players in England
Canadian expatriate ice hockey players in Norway
Canadian expatriate ice hockey players in Italy
Canadian expatriate ice hockey players in Sweden
Ice hockey players from Wisconsin
Canadian expatriate ice hockey players in Germany
American expatriate ice hockey players in England
American expatriate ice hockey players in Norway
American expatriate ice hockey players in Italy
American expatriate ice hockey players in Sweden
American expatriate ice hockey players in Germany